DCC-interacting protein 13-beta is a protein that in humans is encoded by the APPL2 gene.

Model organisms
				
Model organisms have been used in the study of APPL2 function. A conditional knockout mouse line, called Appl2tm1a(KOMP)Wtsi was generated as part of the International Knockout Mouse Consortium program — a high-throughput mutagenesis project to generate and distribute animal models of disease to interested scientists — at the Wellcome Trust Sanger Institute.

Male and female animals underwent a standardized phenotypic screen to determine the effects of deletion. Twenty three tests were carried out on mutant mice, but no significant abnormalities were observed.

References

External links

Further reading

Genes mutated in mice